Dale Roberts (8 October 1956 – 5 February 2003), was a British football player, a centre-half who started his playing career at Ipswich Town

Roberts was born in Newcastle upon Tyne.

Playing career
He was on the Ipswich team at the same time as other centre-half players such as Kevin Beattie, Allan Hunter, Russell Osman and Terry Butcher. He played 24 games before he moved on to Hull City making 182 appearances as the club moved up from fourth to the second division, before retiring through injury. He later had spells with non league North Ferriby United and Bridlington Town.

Coaching career
He started his coaching career at Hull City where he was reunited with manager Colin Appleton who made him a youth team coach. In 1993, he joined up with long-time friend George Burley at Ayr United as an assistant manager before the pair moved to Colchester United where he became caretaker manager in 1994 after Burley left abruptly to join Ipswich. In 1995, he returned to Ipswich as George Burley's assistant manager. Many Ipswich supporters share the memory of Roberts and Burley dancing on the Wembley pitch just after Martijn Reuser had scored the fourth goal in the play-off final. Roberts went on to lead the reserves to the FA Premier Reserve League (South) Championship title in the 2001–02 season.

Death
He died on 5 February 2003, at home in Ipswich, aged 46, after a two-year battle against cancer.

Managerial statistics

Honours
Individual
Ipswich Town Hall of Fame: Inducted 2013

References

1956 births
2003 deaths
English footballers
Ipswich Town F.C. players
Atlanta Chiefs players
Hull City A.F.C. players
North Ferriby United A.F.C. players
Bridlington Town A.F.C. players
Colchester United F.C. managers
English expatriate footballers
Expatriate soccer players in the United States
English Football League players
North American Soccer League (1968–1984) players
Deaths from cancer in England
Association football defenders
English expatriate sportspeople in the United States
English football managers